A Different Shade of Blue is the second studio album by American hardcore punk band Knocked Loose. It was released through Pure Noise Records on August 23, 2019, and produced by Will Putney. It was the last album to feature rhythm guitarist Cole Crutchfield before his departure in 2020.

Critical reception

The album generally received positive reviews.

Accolades

Musical style
The album merges the styles of hardcore punk and heavy metal. It has been categorised as genres such as metalcore, heavy hardcore and sludgecore. It often borders the sounds of Swedish death metal and groove metal. 

Kris Pugh of Distorted Sound magazine described it as putting the band "at the apex of modern hardcore". In an article for Kerrang!, Dan Slessor says that in comparison to the band's previous album: "It’s more hardcore, more metal, there are more fast parts, more breakdowns, more malice, more unease and, perhaps most importantly, more energy". In an article for New Noise magazine, Caleb R Newton said that "There is not a single moment on A Different Shade of Blue that’s not packed to the brim with musical (and thematic!) brutality". However, Connor Atkinson for Exclaim! described "Mistakes Like Fractures" as "overtly catchy".

Track listing

Personnel 
Knocked Loose

 Cole Crutchfield - rhythm guitar, backing vocals
 Bryan Garris - vocals, lyrics
 Isaac Hale - lead guitar, backing vocals
 Kevin "Pacsun" Kaine - drums
 Kevin Otten - bass

Additional personnel

 Emma Boster - additional vocals (Track 03)
 Keith Buckley - additional vocals (Track 08)
 Will Putney - recording, mixing, mastering
 Ridge Rhine - artwork

Charts

References

2019 albums
Knocked Loose albums
Albums produced by Will Putney
Pure Noise Records albums
Sludge metal albums